This is a list of media in Lexington, Kentucky, United States.

Newspapers
Lexington's daily circulating newspaper is the Lexington Herald-Leader. College newspapers include The Kentucky Kernel at the University of Kentucky and The Rambler at Transylvania University. The local alt-weekly is ACE Weekly. Business Lexington is a monthly business newspaper. KyForward.com is an online news site. The Chevy Chaser Magazine and the Southsider Magazine are two community publications. The only bilingual Spanish-English newspaper in the Bluegrass region is La Voz de Kentucky.

Television
Lexington is served by the following television stations:

Radio
It also has numerous radio stations:
 WVLK (News / Talk) - 590 AM
 WLAP (News/Talk) - 630 AM
 WCGW (Southern Gospel / Christian Talk Radio) - 770 AM
 WCBR (Religious Programming) - 1110 AM
 WMST (Adult Standards / 1950s and 1960s Oldies) - 1150 AM
 WLRT (Religious Talk) - 1250 AM
 WLXG (Sports) - 1300 AM
 WMJR (Religious Programming / Gospel Music) - 1380 AM
 WCYN (1950s and 1960s Oldies) - 1400 AM
 WYGH (Religious Programming / Gospel Music / WIOK 107.5 FM simulcast) - 1440 AM
 WWTF (Comedy) - 1580 AM
 WRFL (Alternative / College Radio) - 88.1 FM
 WEKU (Public Radio / Classical Music / NPR / PRI) - 88.9 FM
 WKVO, (Contemporary Christian Music / K-LOVE affiliate) - 89.9 FM "Positive, Encouraging K-Love"
 WMKY, (Public Radio / NPR) - 90.3 FM
 WPTJ, (Contemporary Christian Music / Religious Programming) - 90.7 FM "The Wind"
 WUKY, (Adult Album Alternative / NPR / PRI) - 91.3 FM "NPR Rocks at 91.3" in HD
 W219DM, (Religious) - 91.7 FM
 WBVX (Classic Hits) - 92.1 FM "B92"
 WVLK-FM (Country) - 92.9 FM "K92.9"
 WMXL (Adult Hits / Hot AC (Christmas music in November and December)) - 94.5 FM "Mix 94.5" in HD
 WMJR (Religious) - 94.9 FM (simulcast of WMJR 1380 AM)
 WVRB (Contemporary Christian Music / K-LOVE affiliate) - 95.3 FM "Positive, Encouraging K-Love"
 WZNN (Sports) - 96.1 FM "Sports 96.1 The Zone"
 WGKS (Adult Contemporary / Soft Rock (Christmas music in December)) - 96.9 FM "Kiss-FM"
 WBUL (Country) - 98.1 FM "The Bull" in HD
 WJMM (Religious) - 99.1 FM "Life 99"
 WXCN-LP (Religious) - 99.7 FM (Religious Programming / 3ABN Radio Affiliate)
 WKQQ (Rock) - 100.1 FM "100.1 WKQQ" in HD
 WCYO (Country) - 100.7 FM "100.7 The Coyote"
 WLXX (Adult Hits) - 101.5 FM "Jack FM"
 WKYL (Classical) - 102.1 FM "Classic 102.1"
 WLTO (Rhythmic Top 40) - 102.5 FM "Hot 102"
 WXZZ (Active Rock / Alternative Rock) - 103.3 FM "Z-Rock 103"
 WFRT (Classic hits) - 103.7 FM "Passport Radio"
 W280DO (Urban / Hip Hop) - 103.9 FM "Wild 103.9"
 WLKT (Top 40) - 104.5 FM "The Cat" in HD
 WLXO (Classic Country) - 105.5 FM "105.5 Hank FM"
 WNJK (Variety) - 105.9 FM
 WCDA (Top 40 / Hot AC) - 106.3 FM "Your 106.3"
 WLFX (Top 40) - 106.7 FM "The Dog"
 WLAI (Contemporary Christian Music / Air 1 affiliate) - 107.1 FM "The Positive Alternative, Air 1"
 WBTF (Urban / Hip Hop / R&B) - 107.9 FM "The Beat"

Other
The Lexington Film League formed in 2009.

See also
 Kentucky media
 List of newspapers in Kentucky
 List of radio stations in Kentucky
 List of television stations in Kentucky
 Media of cities in Kentucky: Bowling Green, Louisville

References

Bibliography
 

 
Lexington
Lexington